Sijue Wu (born May 15, 1964) is a Chinese-American mathematician who works as the Robert W. and Lynne H. Browne Professor of Mathematics at the University of Michigan. Her research involves the mathematics of water waves.

Education and career
Wu earned bachelor's and master's degrees in 1983 and 1986 from Peking University. She completed her doctorate in 1990 from Yale University, under the supervision of Ronald Coifman. After a temporary instructorship at New York University, she became an assistant professor at Northwestern University. She moved in 1996 to the University of Iowa and again to the University of Maryland, College Park in 1998. She became the Browne Professor at the University of Michigan in 2008.

Awards and honors
A 1997 paper by Wu in Inventiones Mathematicae, "Well-posedness in Sobolev spaces of the full water wave problem in 2-D", was the subject of a featured review in Mathematical Reviews.

Wu was an invited speaker at the International Congress of Mathematicians in 2002, speaking on partial differential equations.

She won the Ruth Lyttle Satter Prize in Mathematics and the silver Morningside Medal in 2001, and the gold Morningside Medal in 2010, becoming the first female mathematician to win the gold medal. She was elected to the American Academy of Arts and Sciences in 2022.

References

External links
Home page

1964 births
Living people
Chinese women mathematicians
20th-century American mathematicians
21st-century American mathematicians
American women mathematicians
Peking University alumni
Yale University alumni
New York University faculty
Northwestern University faculty
University of Iowa faculty
University of Maryland, College Park faculty
University of Michigan faculty
Chinese emigrants to the United States
20th-century women mathematicians
21st-century women mathematicians
Mathematicians from Zhejiang
Educators from Ningbo
20th-century American women
21st-century American women